Selbyville is a town in Sussex County, Delaware, United States. Its population was 2,167 at the 2010 census, an increase of 31.7% over the previous decade. It is part of the Salisbury, Maryland-Delaware Metropolitan Statistical Area.

History
Selbyville was founded in 1778 and incorporated in 1902.

It was originally known as Sandy Branch, due to its location on a branch of that name emanating in the Cypress Swamp at the head of the St. Martin's River. A grist mill and saw mill opened there in the late 18th century. In 1842, Sampson Selby began marking packages for delivery to his country store, Selby-Ville.

By 1918, Selbyville was the major supplier of strawberries for the east coast, an industry that remained strong until the 1930s.

Today, one of its main employers is Mountaire Farms, a poultry company with a processing plant on Hosier Street.

The town is also home of the Mumford Sheet Metal Works, which held the world record for the largest frying pan in 1950.

Selbyville is also home to Doyle's Restaurant, recognized by the State of Delaware as the state's oldest operating diner. (The original 1930s diner is attached to a modern expansion.)

Transportation

The main means of transport to and from Selbyville is by road. U.S. Route 113 is the primary highway serving the town, connecting north towards Georgetown and south into Maryland. Delaware Route 54 also serves the town, traversing east to west along the southern edge of the state. Finally, Delaware Route 17 extends northeastward from Selbyville to Millville. The Snow Hill Line of the Maryland and Delaware Railroad runs north-south through Selbyville.

Geography
Selbyville is located at  (38.4603917, –75.2207438).

Demographics

At the 2000 census there were 1,645 people, 615 households, and 439 families living in the town. The racial makeup of the town was 72.89% White, 15.38% African American, 0.73% Asian, 0.55% Pacific Islander, 9.48% from other races, and 0.97% from two or more races. Hispanic or Latino of any race were 21.09%.

Of the 615 households 28.3% had children under the age of 18 living with them, 51.9% were married couples living together, 14.0% had a female householder with no husband present, and 28.6% were non-families. 24.6% of households were one person and 13.8% were one person aged 65 or older.  The average household size was 2.67 and the average family size was 3.05.

The age distribution was 24.3% under the age of 18, 7.7% from 18 to 24, 28.7% from 25 to 44, 21.7% from 45 to 64, and 17.6% 65 or older.  The median age was 37 years. For every 100 females, there were 104.1 males.  For every 100 females age 18 and over, there were 95.8 males.

The median household income was $36,250 and the median family income  was $41,522. Males had a median income of $25,368 versus $20,660 for females. The per capita income for the town was $16,965.  About 10.6% of families and 11.7% of the population were below the poverty line, including 13.4% of those under age 18 and 12.4% of those age 65 or over.

Public library

The former home of Senator John G. Townsend, Jr., located at 11 South Main Street at the intersection with West McCabe Street, became the site of the Selbyville Public Library in 1966. A plaque in the library identifies Senator Townsend's dining room, where former First Lady Eleanor Roosevelt dined with the senator in 1946. Other distinguished visitors included future president Richard Nixon. The home was built in 1904. The senator's family donated it to the library after his death.

See also
 List of towns in Delaware

References

External links

 

 
Towns in Sussex County, Delaware
Towns in Delaware
Salisbury metropolitan area
Populated places established in 1902
1902 establishments in Delaware